Of This I'm Sure is a studio album from Jenny & Tyler. Residence Music released the album on October 16, 2015.

Critical reception

Awarding the album four stars at CCM Magazine, Kevin Sparkman asserts, "With refreshing sounds, and sing-able melodies to boot...The couple's sleeve-ridden sincerity and attention to painstaking detail make this project especially enjoyable." Brian Palmer, reviewing the album from C-Ville, states, "Whether it's the driving, swelling orchestral title track or the gorgeous ambient folk-pop update of fan favorite 'Song for You,' Jenny & Tyler's latest stirs your soul with anthemic music, lyrics that wind their way through your heart and crushing harmonies."

Track listing

Chart performance

References

2015 albums
Folk albums by American artists
Folk-pop albums